Charlotte Hughes (born in 1954) is an American author of romance and comedy novels, who lives in South Carolina.

Biography
Hughes was born in Williamston, South Carolina; soon after her birth, her family relocated to Texas. While she was a voracious reader as a child, she didn't care for the canonical works. She's said, "In high school and college, I was force-fed a lot of what is considered great literature. I must’ve been a shallow person because I didn’t appreciate it at the time, and I don’t remember most of what I read."

Hughes began her writing career in the early 1980s as the features editor of a small newspaper. She wrote humorous short pieces before venturing into longer works.

Career

Hughes, a New York Times best selling author, has written almost 40 books. These award-winning books run the gamut from romance to mystery, as well as humor, horror and suspense.

Hughes was one of the first category romance writers to secure a top-50 ranking on USA Todays list. A two-time recipient of the Maggie Award, she has also won the Talisman Award for best short story writer.

Bibliography

Max Holt (with Janet Evanovich)

 1. Full House (2002)
 2. Full Tilt (2002)
 3. Full Speed (2003)
 4. Full Blast (2004)
 5. Full Bloom (2005)
 The Full Box (omnibus) (2006)
 6. Full Scoop (2006)

Novels

 Too Many Husbands (1986)
 Straight Shootin (1987)
 Travelin' Man (1988)
 Sweet Misery (1988)
 Tigress (1989)
 Scoundrel (1989)
 Private Eyes (1990)
 Restless Night (1990)
 Louisiana Lovin' (1990)
 Tough Guy, Savvy Lady (1991)
 The Lady and the Cowboy (1991)
 Rascal (1992)
 Island Rogue (1992)
 The Incredible Hunk (1993)
 Kissed by a Rogue (1993)
 The Devil and Miss Goody-Two Shoes (1994)
 Husband Wanted (1995)
 Ready-Made Family (1995)
 Belated Bride (1996)
 Tall, Dark, and Bad (1996)
 Valley of the Shadow (1998)
 Just Married...Again (1998)
 The Last Southern Belle (1998)
 Night Kills (1998)
 New Attitude (2001)
 Hot Shot (2002)
 Millionaire Cop and Mom-To-Be (2002)
 And After That, The Dark (2004)See Bride Run! (2014)Welcome to Temptation (2015)Miss Goody Two-Shoes (2015)

Omnibus

 Tall, Dark and Cranky / Millionaire CopKate Holly Series

 What Looks Like Crazy (Feb 2008)
 Nutcase (Feb 2009)
 High Anxiety'' (Dec 2009)

References

External links
 Official website
 Fantastic Fiction

20th-century American novelists
American romantic fiction novelists
Living people
21st-century American novelists
American women novelists
20th-century American women writers
21st-century American women writers
Women romantic fiction writers
1954 births
People from Williamston, South Carolina